John Melbourne Howard (1913 – 10 August 1982) was a British Conservative Party politician.

Howard was educated at Whitgift School, South Croydon.  He served in the Royal Navy (1941–46), in minesweepers during World War II, holding the rank of sub-lieutenant. He worked as a chartered accountant.

In the 1945 general election, Howard stood as a Liberal in Croydon North, coming third. He joined the Conservative Party and became a councillor on the London County Council (LCC) in 1949, representing Hammersmith South. In 1951, he was Conservative candidate in Hammersmith North, without success. He became an alderman of the LCC in 1952 until 1954.

In 1955, Howard was elected Member of Parliament for Southampton Test, defeating Labour's candidate Tony Crosland. He stood down in 1964.

References

External links 
 

1913 births
1982 deaths
Royal Navy officers
Conservative Party (UK) MPs for English constituencies
Members of London County Council
People educated at Whitgift School
Liberal Party (UK) parliamentary candidates
UK MPs 1955–1959
UK MPs 1959–1964